The Lucky Ones is the eighth studio album released by American alternative rock band Mudhoney. It was released by Sub Pop Records on May 20, 2008.

Writing and recording
The band has said that the album was written "from the rhythm up instead of from the riff and the lyrics down" and has also stated that it's the fastest album they made. As singer and rhythm guitarist Mark Arm has said "The effect is to thrust out the bottom-end rumble of drummer Dan Peters and bassist Guy Maddison, and to bring about a cohesive whole not entirely ruled by the almighty riff—although you certainly don’t have to look hard to find ‘em." Rather spontaneously, the veterans recorded the eleven songs found on the record in only 3.5 days, including overdubs. The ninth track on the album is titled "Tales of Terror" in honour of the Sacramento hardcore punk band Tales of Terror that influenced and inspired the grunge movement.

Track listing
All songs written by Mudhoney.

 "I'm Now" - 2:40
 "Inside Out Over You" - 3:25
 "The Lucky Ones" - 4:52
 "Next Time" - 3:01
 "And the Shimmering Light" - 3:05
 "The Open Mind" - 2:26
 "What's This Thing?" - 2:54
 "Running Out" - 3:28
 "Tales of Terror" - 3:17
 "We Are Rising" - 4:30
 "New Meaning" - 2:39

Personnel
 Mark Arm - vocals
 Steve Turner - guitar
 Dan Peters - drums
 Guy Maddison - bass
 Tucker Martine - production, mixing
 Floyd Reitsma - assistant engineer
 Bill Inglot - mastering
 Dave Schultz - mastering
 Jeff Kleinsmith - art direction and design

References

2008 albums
Mudhoney albums
Sub Pop albums